The 2019 Nigerian Senate election in Ondo State held on February 23, 2019, to elect members of the Nigerian Senate to represent Ondo State. Akinyelure Patrick Ayo representing Ondo Central, and  Nicholas Tofowomo representing Ondo South both won on the platform of the People's Democratic Party (Nigeria), while Robert Ajayi Boroffice representing Ondo North won on the platform of All Progressives Congress.

Overview

Summary

Results

Ondo Central 
A total of 16 candidates registered with the Independent National Electoral Commission to contest in the election. PDP candidate Akinyelure Patrick Ayo won the election, defeating APC candidate Tayo Alasoadura and 14 other party candidates. Akinyelure received 33.11% of the votes, while Alasoadura received 28.59%.

Ondo South 
A total of 15 candidates registered with the Independent National Electoral Commission to contest in the election. PDP candidate Nicholas Tofowomo won the election, defeating APC candidate Yele Omogunwa and 13 other party candidates. Tofowomo received 42.98% of the votes, while Yele Omogunwa received 21.19%.

Ondo North 
A total of 10 candidates registered with the Independent National Electoral Commission to contest in the election. APC candidate Robert Ajayi Boroffice won the election, defeating Olusegun Philips-Alonge and 8 other party candidates. Boroffice received 30.30% of the votes, while Philips-Alonge received 18.76%.

References 

Ondo State senatorial elections
Ondo State Senate elections